Archibald Hugh "Toots" "Tootsie" Douglas (February 8, 1885 – December 12, 1972) was a college football and baseball player and distinguished veteran of World War II. He once commanded the aircraft carrier . He also served in World War I, as part of the Northern Bombing Group.

Early years
Douglas was born on February 8, 1885, in Bennettsville, South Carolina, but grew up in Knoxville, Tennessee, the son of Archibald J. Douglas and Nan Harlan.

University of Tennessee

Football
Douglas was once a prominent running back for the Tennessee Volunteers football teams of the University of Tennessee.

1902
The 1902 Volunteers won a school record six games and beat rivals Sewanee and Georgia Tech. 1902 was also the first time that Tennessee scored on Vanderbilt in their Rivalry game. The team closed the season with an 11 to 0 loss to John Heisman's Clemson Tigers. Douglas holds the record for the longest punt in school history when he punted a ball 109 yards (the field length was 110 yards in those days) during the Clemson game. Heisman described the kick:

In the loss to Vanderbilt, Tennessee's only score was provided by an A. H. Douglas run around right end, breaking two tackles and getting the touchdown. Douglas was selected All-Southern. Nash Buckingham and Sax Crawford were teammates.

Naval Academy

Football
Douglas then played for the Navy Midshipmen from 1904 to 1907, a teammate of Bill Dague.

1905
Douglas made the tying score in the Army–Navy Game of 1905.

1907
He was captain of the team in 1907. He was selected a third-team All-American by Walter Camp and a first-team All-American by the New York Tribune. Captain Douglas called the tie to Vanderbilt "the bitterest pill I have ever had to swallow."

Baseball
On the baseball team he was a pitcher.

See also
 1902 College Football All-Southern Team
 1907 College Football All-America Team

References

External links
 

Tennessee Volunteers football players
All-Southern college football players
American football halfbacks
American football punters
Navy Midshipmen football players
Tennessee Volunteers baseball players
Baseball players from Knoxville, Tennessee
Players of American football from Knoxville, Tennessee
Navy Midshipmen baseball players
Baseball pitchers
United States Navy personnel of World War II
1885 births
1972 deaths